Arthroleptis sylvaticus is a species of frog in the family Arthroleptidae. It is found in Cameroon, Central African Republic, Republic of the Congo, Democratic Republic of the Congo, and Gabon, and possibly Equatorial Guinea and Nigeria. Its natural habitat is subtropical or tropical moist lowland forests.
It is threatened by habitat loss.

References

sylvaticus
Amphibians of Sub-Saharan Africa
Taxonomy articles created by Polbot
Amphibians described in 1954